Ahmad Syihan Hazmi Bin Mohamed (born 22 February 1996) is a Malaysian professional footballer who plays as a goalkeeper for Malaysia Super League side Johor Darul Ta'zim and the Malaysian national team.

Club career
Ahmad Syihan started his career with Bukit Jalil Sports School in 2012. The following year, he joined Harimau Muda C which was competing in the 2013 Malaysia FAM League.

After being released by Harimau Muda C, he signed with Kelantan but his playing time was limited to the Malaysia President's Cup. His only official appearances for Kelantan were in the final group stage match of Malaysia Cup against Pahang on 20 August 2016 where Kelantan lost 2-0. He also save a penalty taken by Kogileswaran Raj in that match.

In 2018 he joined Negeri Sembilan but was banned 20 months by Asian Football Confederation for failing a doping test while participating in the AFC U-23 Championship in China.

In 2020, he returned from suspension and signed for Petaling Jaya City Due to a lack playing time because of the in-form Kalamullah Al-Hafiz, he left the club for another stint at Negeri Sembilan. 

In February 2022, he played as starting goalkeeper for Negeri Sembilan in a pre-season cup match against Kuala Lumpur City and won the Federal Territory Minister Cup. He made his official second debut for Negeri Sembilan against Sabah in Super League on 4 March 2022. Negeri Sembilan won 1-0 which also saw him saving a penalty taken by Neto Pessoa.

He recently signed for Johor Darul Ta'zim for the 2023 Malaysia Super League season.

International career
Syihan made an unofficial appearance for Malaysia at the age of 17 years 1 month 4 days in a charity match (non FIFA 'A' international) against Palestine after replacing Norazlan Razali. In that match, he saved a penalty.

He received his first call-up for the national under-22 team and made his first start against Bahrain, with the match ending in a 0-0 draw. In 2017, he was the first choice goalkeeper in the Dubai Cup Football Tournament. In 2018, he was the third goalkeeper for the national under 23 team in the 2018 AFC U-23 Championship.

Honours

Club
Johor Darul Ta'zim
 Malaysia Charity Shield: 2023

International
Malaysia
King's Cup runner-up: 2022

References

External links
 
 

Living people
1996 births
People from Kelantan
Malaysian people of Malay descent
Malaysian footballers
People from Kota Bharu
Kelantan FA players
Negeri Sembilan FA players
Negeri Sembilan FC players
Petaling Jaya City FC players
Association football goalkeepers